Joachim Frederick of Schleswig-Holstein-Sonderburg-Plön (9 May 1668, Magdeburg – 25 January 1722, Plön), also known as Joachim Frederick of Schleswig-Holstein-Plön, was the third Duke of Schleswig-Holstein-Plön, a dukedom created by the division of the Duchy of Schleswig-Holstein-Sonderburg.

Life
Joachim Frederick of Schleswig-Holstein-Sonderburg-Plön was born in Magdeburg on 9 May 1668. He was a scion of an insignificant branch of the Plön family, a collateral line of Schleswig-Holstein-Nordborg, with its seat at Nordborg Castle on the island of Alsen, itself formed from a division of the inheritance of Plön's first duke, Joachim Ernest in 1671.  He was the eldest son of Augustus, Duke of Schleswig-Holstein-Sonderburg-Plön-Norburg (1635-1699) and his wife, Elisabeth Charlotte of Anhalt-Harzgerode (1647-1723).

When the incumbent Duke of Plön, John Adolphus, died in 1704, a few days after his son, Adolphus Augustus, was killed in a riding accident, the male Plön line could be continued only through Leopold Augustus, grandson of John Adolphus and son of Adolphus Augustus.  Leopold Augustus died as a child of four in 1706, and the underlying entitlement to the inheritance of Plön passed as a result to Joachim Frederick.  Joachim Frederick himself had no male heir when he died in Plön on 25 January 1722, deeply in debt.  Plön Castle, the ancestral residence of the dukes of Plön, lay empty for seven years and some of its furniture was sold off; the Danish royal house administered the duchy during this period.

Seven years after the death of Duke Joachim Frederick, Frederick Charles, the son of the morganatic marriage of the late duke's brother, Christian Charles, was named the fourth Duke of Plön.  He would prove to be the last.

Family 
Joachim Frederick was married twice. His first wife, Magdalene Juliana of Zweibrücken-Birkenfeld, whom he married in 1704 after becoming Duke of Plön, was a daughter of John Charles, Count Palatine of Gelnhausen (1686-1720).  Joachim Frederick and Magdalene Juliana had four daughters:
 Charlotte Amalia (1709-1787), who became a nun in Gandersheim Abbey 
 Elizabeth Juliana (*1711)
 Dorothea Augusta Frederica (1712-1765), a nun in Gandersheim Abbey
 Christiana Louise (1713–1778)
 married in 1735 Count Albert Louis Frederick of Hohenlohe-Weikersheim (1716–1744)
 married in 1749 Prince Louis Frederick of Saxe-Hildburghausen.

On 17 February 1721, Joachim Frederick married his second wife, Juliana Louise (1698–1740), a daughter of Christian Eberhard, Prince of East Frisia.  She miscarried their only child on 28 May 1722, four months after Joachim Frederick's death.

Ancestors

See also 
 Schleswig-Holstein-Sonderburg

External links 
 Family tree of the House of Schleswig-Holstein-Sonderburg
 Family line of Schleswig-Holstein-Plön

Dukes of Schleswig-Holstein-Sonderburg-Norburg
Dukes of Schleswig-Holstein-Sonderburg-Plön
1668 births
1722 deaths